Ho Tze-Lok  (born 26 October 1995) also known as Tomato Ho is a Hong Kong professional squash player. As of February 2018, she was ranked number 48 and highest ranking was rank number 43. in the world.

Career
Tze-Lok's wins include the 2017 City of Greater Bendigo International, Perrier Challenge Cup and Brisbane City Sandgate Open.

In 2018, she was part of the Hong Kong team that won the bronze medal at the 2018 Women's World Team Squash Championships.

References

1995 births
Living people
Hong Kong female squash players
Asian Games medalists in squash
Asian Games gold medalists for Hong Kong
Squash players at the 2018 Asian Games
Medalists at the 2018 Asian Games